The 1938 Louisiana Tech Bulldogs football team was an American football team that represented the Louisiana Polytechnic Institute (now known as Louisiana Tech University) as a member of the Southern Intercollegiate Athletic Association during the 1938 college football season. In their fifth year under head coach Eddie McLane, the team compiled a 3–7–1 record. Huey Williamson was the team's captain.

Schedule

References

Louisiana Tech
Louisiana Tech Bulldogs football seasons
Louisiana Tech Bulldogs football